Puguang Temple, may refer to:

 Puguang Temple (Zhangjiajie), in Zhangjiajie, Hunan, China
 Puguang Temple (Xingtai), in Xingtai, Hebei, China
 Puguang Temple (Xiamen), in Xiamen, Fujian, China